Phil Harding may refer to:

 Phil Harding (archaeologist) (born 1950), British field archaeologist and television personality on Time Team
 Phil Harding (producer) (born 1957), British music engineer, producer, and remixer best known for partnership with keyboardist Ian Curnow
 Phil Harding (BBC executive), journalist and media consultant, former editor at the BBC